Slaves of Cupid is a 2015 Burmese drama film, directed by Wyne starring Nay Toe, Sai Sai Kham Leng and Phway Phway. The film, produced by Lu Swan Kaung Film Production premiered in Myanmar on July 31, 2015.

Cast
Nay Toe as A Thu
Sai Sai Kham Leng as Thet Shi
Phway Phway as Eant Yoon

References

2015 films
2010s Burmese-language films
Burmese drama films
Films shot in Myanmar
Films directed by Wyne
2015 drama films